William Sackville is the name of:

Sir William Sackville (died 1592), English army officer in the service of Henry IV of France
William Sackville, 10th Earl De La Warr (1921–1988), British peer 
William Sackville, 11th Earl De La Warr (born 1948), British peer
William Sackville, Lord Buckhurst (born 1979), son and heir of William Sackville, 11th Earl De La Warr